Season thirteen of the television program American Experience originally aired on the PBS network in the United States on October 16, 2000 and concluded on April 23, 2001. Beginning with this season, American Experience began broadcasting without a host, and the word "The" was dropped. The season contained 12 new episodes and began with the first part of the film The Rockefellers.

Episodes

 Denotes multiple chapters that aired on the same date and share the same episode number

References

2000 American television seasons
2001 American television seasons
American Experience